Weckström may refer to:

Anu Weckström (born 1977), Finnish badminton player
Alexander Weckström (born 1987), Finnish footballer
Björn Weckström (born 1935), Finnish sculptor and jewelry designer
John Weckström (born 1980), Finnish footballer
Kristoffer Weckström (born 1983), Finnish footballer
Kurt Weckström (1911–1983), Finnish footballer
Nina Weckström (born 1979), Finnish badminton player